Windy Lake may refer to one of eight lakes of that name in Ontario, Canada:

Windy Lake in Algoma District, NTS Map sheet 041J10
Windy Lake in Parry Sound District, NTS Map sheet 041H16
In Sudbury District:
Windy Lake, NTS Map sheet 041I10
Windy Lake, NTS Map sheet 041I11
Windy Lake, NTS Map sheet 041O09
In Thunder Bay District:
Windy Lake, NTS Map sheet 052B01
Windy Lake, NTS Map sheet 052G01
Windy Lake in Timiskaming District, NTS Map sheet 031M04

References

Lakes of Ontario